The Tatnall School is a private college preparatory private school in unincorporated New Castle County, Delaware; it has a Wilmington postal address and is adjacent to, but not in, the Greenville census-designated place.

The school is for students from three years old through 12th grade. The school was founded as an all-girls school in 1930 by Frances Dorr Swift Tatnall at her home in downtown Wilmington, Delaware, and moved to its current location in 1952. Tatnall began to admit boys in 1952 (the class of 1964). The school's mascot is the hornet. Its motto is "Omnia in caritate", which means all things in love.

Accreditation 
Middle States Association of Colleges and Schools

Arts 
Tatnall offers a variety of visual and performing arts programs, including photography, drawing, instrumental and vocal performance.  In September 2017, Tatnall opened its 23,000 square foot Laird Performing Arts Center.  The center boasts a 471-seat theater.  Here, the Tatnall arts program puts on its annual Showcase advanced theater class and performance, now in its 48th year. One notable instructor is Wilson Somers, who is also a composer and performer; Somers was also a recipient of an Emmy award in 2000. Students at the school are required to participate in art programs, and have won numerous state awards throughout the years.

2008 election
Tatnall was a Delaware polling booth in the 2008 United States presidential election. Senator Joe Biden (a native Pennsylvanian but Delaware resident since 1953), who lives near the school, cast his vote in Tatnall's main lobby in that election cycle. Some of Joe Biden's grandchildren attend the school.

Notable alumni 
Zach Baylin - American Screenwriter 
Scott Beale - Associate Director for Global Operations at Peace Corps
Jake Bergey - American Lacrosse Player
Wayne Kimmel - American venture capitalist
Margaret H. Marshall - 24th chief justice of the Massachusetts Supreme Judicial Court
Miriam E. Nelson - New York Times bestselling Author 
Hallie Olivere Biden - School counselor and wife of Beau Biden
Sam Parsons - Professional runner for Adidas
Mick Purzycki - CEO of Jerry Media

References

External links 
 

Educational institutions established in 1930
Private elementary schools in Delaware
High schools in New Castle County, Delaware
Schools in New Castle County, Delaware
Private middle schools in Delaware
Private high schools in Delaware
Private K-12 schools in the United States
1930 establishments in Delaware
Girls' schools in the United States
History of women in Delaware